GU-Racing is a German racing team owned by Günther Unterreitmeier. The team was founded in 2003.

History
The team has competed in several series, including Superleague Formula running the Olympiacos CFP and the FC Basel 1893 teams. They also run A1 Team Germany in A1 Grand Prix. The team has also had success running in Formula BMW and Formula Renault series around the world.

References

External links
GU Racing official website

German auto racing teams
A1 Grand Prix racing teams
Formula BMW teams
Formula 3 Euro Series teams
German Formula 3 teams
FIA Formula 3 European Championship teams
Auto racing teams established in 2003
Superleague Formula teams
British Formula Three teams